Moe Win may refer to:

 Moe Z. Win, Burmese-American mathematician and electrical engineer 
 Moe Win (footballer) (born 1988), footballer from Myanmar